Arnfinn Espeseth (born 23 December 1945) is a Norwegian footballer. He played in two matches for the Norway national football team from 1970 to 1971.

References

External links
 
 

1945 births
Living people
Norwegian footballers
Norway international footballers
Place of birth missing (living people)
Association football midfielders
SK Brann players